The 2014 CIS/CCA Curling Championships was held from March 19 to 23 at the Callie Curling Club in Regina, Saskatchewan. The host university of the event was the University of Regina. The winners represented Canada at the 2015 Winter Universiade in Granada, Spain.

Men

Teams
The teams are listed as follows:

Round-robin standings
Final round-robin standings

Playoffs

Semifinal
Saturday, March 23, 7:00 pm

Final
Sunday, March 24, 5:00 pm

Women

Teams
The teams are listed as follows:

Round-robin standings
Final round-robin standings

Playoffs

Semifinal
Saturday, March 23, 7:00 pm

Final
Sunday, March 24, 2:00 pm

References

External links

CIS/CCA Curling Championships
Curling in Saskatchewan
Sports competitions in Regina, Saskatchewan
CIS/CCA Curling Championships
CIS/CCA Curling Championships